Senda or SENDA may refer to:

Aisa Senda
Kakou Senda
Koreya Senda
Sadaaki Senda
Yoshihiro Senda
Special Educational Needs and Disability Act 2001